XOXO Entertainment is a record label in Thailand founded in 2020 as a music label under Workpoint Entertainment Public Company Limited and T-Pop Incorporation Company Limited as a teenager music label, Emphasis on Thai pop music (T-Pop), including pop music and pop dance. And also has a subsidiary record label, XOFLOW, a hip-hop label.

Company Information

2020

Launch of the company and the first Girl Group 4EVE 
XOXO Entertainment was launched and mentioned for the first time in the 4EVE Girl Group Star survival contest was to find XOXO Entertainment's first Girl Group artist. Broadcast via Workpoint TV, by the all 7 members and the group official debut on Wednesday, December 23, 2020 at the KBank Siam Pic-Ganesha Theater Siam Square One Shopping Center.

2021

Project NVL (Neverland) Boy Star 
In Sunday March, 28, 2021, 4EVE The First Album was released. Later, in May, XOXO Entertainment applications and auditions for male trainees for a project called Neverland Boy Star have been opened to join the label's new artist group.  Like 4EVE Girl Group Star, it will be a survival show format to discover XOXO Entertainment's new boy band.  It is scheduled to be broadcast within 2023.

The first boy group ATLAS 
In September 2021, the name of XOXO Entertainment's first Boy Band was announced, ATLAS (แอทลาส). Members were officially revealed and made their official debut on Tuesday, December 7, 2021 at the forecourt of Central World.

First male-female solo artist WAII and Jack Jarupong 
Then on Friday, December 24, 2021, XOXO Entertainment  has released a special single with a music video welcomed Christmas Day Mysterious things in the universe (สิ่งลึกลับซับซ้อนในจักรวาล), An old song of Juliet Balcony band, written by Prapas Cholsaranon, national artist and deputy chief executive officer of Workpoint Entertainment. This single also introduced two new artists was Jack Jarupong Kluaymai-ngam (จารุพงศ์ กล้วยไม้งาม) and Waii Panyarisa Thienprasit (ปัญญริสา เธียรประสิทธิ์). Former artist of Kamikaze label in subsidiary of the RS company, along with 6 trainees in label.

Reference

External links 
 

Thai record labels
Companies of Thailand
th:เอ็กซ์โอเอ็กซ์โอเอนเตอร์เทนเมนต์